The Junior League World Series Central Region is one of six United States regions that currently sends teams to the World Series in Taylor, Michigan. The region's participation in the JLWS dates back to 1981.

Central Region States

Region Champions
As of the 2022 Junior League World Series.

Results by State
As of the 2022 Junior League World Series.

See also
Central Region in other Little League divisions
Little League – Central 1957-2000
Little League – Great Lakes
Little League – Midwest
Intermediate League
Senior League
Big League

References

Central
Baseball competitions in the United States
Sports in the Midwestern United States